Matinecock is a village located within the Town of Oyster Bay in Nassau County, on Long Island, in New York, United States. The population was 810 at the 2010 census.

History 
Matinecock incorporated as a village on April 2, 1928, in order to gain home rule powers.

The village is named for the Matinecock Nation, which inhabited much of the area. "Matinecock" roughly translates to "the Hill Country," and was the Matinecock Nation's name for much of the area.

In May 1998, Worth Magazine ranked Matinecock as the fifth richest town in America and the richest town in New York.

Geography

Demographics

At the 2000 census there were 836 people, 285 households, and 216 families in the village. The population density was 315.6 people per square mile (121.8/km). There were 313 housing units at an average density of 118.1 per square mile (45.6/km).  The racial makeup of the village was 96.05% White, 1.08% African American, 1.56% Asian, and 1.32% from two or more races. Hispanic or Latino of any race were 3.83%.

Of the 285 households 36.8% had children under the age of 18 living with them, 67.7% were married couples living together, 3.9% had a female householder with no husband present, and 24.2% were non-families. 20.7% of households were one person and 10.2% were one person aged 65 or older. The average household size was 2.93 and the average family size was 3.31.

The age distribution was 26.8% under the age of 18, 4.5% from 18 to 24, 26.1% from 25 to 44, 27.3% from 45 to 64, and 15.3% 65 or older. The median age was 40 years. For every 100 females, there were 95.8 males. For every 100 females age 18 and over, there were 98.1 males.

The median household income was $135,922 and the median family income  was $171,832. Males had a median income of $100,000 versus $36,042 for females. The per capita income for the village was $93,559. About 2.1% of families and 4.1% of the population were below the poverty line, including 3.3% of those under age 18 and 4.3% of those age 65 or over.

Education

Schools

Public 
The Village of Matinecock is located entirely within the boundaries of the Locust Valley Central School District. As such, all children who reside within Matinecock and attend public schools go to Locust Valley's schools.

Private 
The private Portledge School is located within Matinecock.

Library district 
Matinecock is located within the boundaries of the Locust Valley Library District.

References

External links
 Official website

Oyster Bay (town), New York
Villages in New York (state)
Villages in Nassau County, New York